The Kansas City Symphony (KCS) is a United States symphony orchestra based in Kansas City, Missouri. The current music director is conductor Michael Stern. The Symphony performs at the Kauffman Center for the Performing Arts, located at 1601 Broadway Boulevard.

History
Kansas City's first symphony orchestra was the Kansas City Symphony, formed in 1911 for Carl Busch. It ceased operations at the start of World War I, as many of the musicians were sent to War. Kansas City's second symphony orchestra was the Kansas City Philharmonic, founded in 1933 and dissolved in 1982. Only months later, seeing the necessity for a new symphony orchestra, businessman and philanthropist R. Crosby Kemper, Jr. founded the Kansas City Symphony. Kemper chose a group of other prominent Kansas Citians, including Hallmark Cards Chairman and CEO Donald J. Hall, Sr. and H&R Block co-founder Henry W. Bloch, to be the founding trustees; together, the first board established the Symphony's initial endowment. They also promulgated the Symphony's mission, to "advance and advocate the art of classical music for the enrichment of the community."

In 2002, the Kansas City Symphony was instrumental in developing the Concert Companion, led by then-executive director Roland Valliere. Funded by the William and Flora Hewlett Foundation, John S. and James L. Knight Foundation, the Andrew W. Mellon Foundation and the David and Lucile Packard Foundation, the Concert Companion was tested by the Kansas City Symphony, as well as the New York Philharmonic, Philadelphia Orchestra, Pittsburgh Symphony, Aspen Music Festival, and Oakland East Bay Symphony.

The previous home of the Symphony was the Lyric Theatre until September 2011 when it moved to Helzberg Hall in the Kauffman Center for the Performing Arts.

Today

The Kansas City Symphony currently has 80 full-time musicians, all area residents. Each year, it plays a 42-week season, which includes subscription concerts, educational concerts, regional and national tours, and public outreach concerts. The Symphony also performs music for the Lyric Opera of Kansas City and the Kansas City Ballet.

In addition to ordinary donations and concert proceeds, the Symphony is supported by four specialized auxiliary groups. Together, these groups raise over $1,000,000 each year. Fund-raising events include Kansas City's main debutante ball, the Jewel Ball (which also benefits the Nelson-Atkins Museum of Art), the Symphony Ball, the Symphony Designers' Showhouse (a home renovation expo in Kansas City's Country Club District which chooses one historic home to renovate each year), a Friends of the Symphony Gift Shop, and a docent program for educational concerts. In the 2018/19 season, the symphony's annual budget was nearly $19 million.

The symphony released its first compact disc, American Voices, conducted by William McGlaughlin, in 1995. The Sound of Kansas City CD debuted in 2004.  In July 2008 the Symphony released Gordon Chin's Formosa Seasons on the Naxos label, and two settings for Shakespeare's Tempest (by Arthur Sullivan and Jean Sibelius) with Reference Recordings. The Symphony released Britten's Orchestra, in 2009, a Vaughan Williams/Elgar disc in 2013 and a Hindemith/Prokofiev/Bartok disc in 2014 also with Reference Recordings. Additionally, the Symphony has performed on National Public Radio and has participated in two nationally broadcast PBS television specials, the latest being Homecoming: The Kansas City Symphony presents Joyce DiDonato, recorded in Helzberg Hall at the Kauffman Center for the Performing Arts. Every week during the Symphony's season, KCUR-FM broadcasts highlights of Symphony performances.

Music directors
2004–present: Michael Stern
1999–2003: Anne Manson
1986–1997: William McGlaughlin
1982–1986: Russell Patterson

See also
Bill McGlaughlin
Compositions by Bill McGlaughlin

References

External links
The Kansas City Symphony (official site)

Musical groups established in 1982
American orchestras
Culture of Kansas City, Missouri
Tourist attractions in Kansas City, Missouri
Performing arts in Missouri
Musical groups from Missouri
1982 establishments in Missouri